Ahmad Inaltigin (also spelled Yinaltigin), was a Turkic commander who served under the early Ghaznavid rulers, but later rebelled against them.

Biography 
During his early career, Ahmad served as treasurer of the Ghaznavid ruler Mahmud, and had good relations with him. When Mahmud died in 1030, he was succeeded by his son Mohammad Ghaznavi, who was, however, shortly deposed by his more capable brother Mas'ud I, who disliked the servants of his father, and forced Ahmad to surrender the riches he had gathered.

Although Ahmad had no military experience, he was appointed in 1031 as the commander-in-chief of the army in India and was stationed at Lahore. His task was mainly to collect tribute from the Indian princes, but in order to avenge the bad treatment he had undergone during his career, he began recruiting Turkic mercenaries from Central Asia, and in 1033 rebelled against Mas'ud, who shortly sent an army, which Ahmad with no difficulty defeated, and even managed to kill the general of the army. Mas'ud then sent another army under an Indian statesman who had converted to Islam named Tilak, who managed to rout Ahmad Inaltigin, who drowned while he was trying to cross the Indus River in order to escape from Tilak.

References

Sources 
 
 

1033 deaths
Year of birth unknown
11th-century Turkic people
Ghaznavid generals